Rafael Eduardo Fernández Inzunza (born 5 August 2000) is a Mexican professional footballer who plays as a centre-back for Liga MX club Querétaro.

Career statistics

Club

References

External links
 
 
 

Living people
2000 births
Mexican footballers
Association football defenders
Dorados de Sinaloa footballers
Liga de Expansión MX players
Liga MX players
Querétaro F.C. footballers
Footballers from Sinaloa
Sportspeople from Culiacán